The 2012–13 season was PAOK Football Club's 87th in existence and the club's 54th consecutive season in the top flight of Greek football. The team entered the Greek Football Cup in the Third Round and also competed in UEFA Europa League starting from the third qualifying round.

On 31 May 2012, Giorgos Donis signed a two-year contract, becoming PAOK's manager after the sacking of László Bölöni in the end of 2011–12 season.

Season overview
On 23 May, it was announced that 35-year-old Pablo García renewed his contract with the club's outfit for one more year.
On 25 May, PAOK released László Bölöni from the position of first team head coach, after a one-year cooperation.
On 25 May, Lino also renewed his contract for one more year.
On 28 May, Pantelis Konstantinidis resigned from the position of vice-president and technical director, claiming a different perception and philosophy, on the strategy to be followed for the new season.
On 31 May, PAOK appointed Giorgos Donis as the new manager on a two-year contract, with immediate effect.
On 7 June, it was announced that club's new technical director would be Georgios Georgiadis.
On 1 July, Kostas Chalkias, Sotiris Balafas, Bruno Cirillo, Vladimir Ivić and Mirosław Sznaucner leave PAOK upon the expiry of their contracts. The players were part of the main squad for the last years.
On 5 July, the team departed for Arnhem, Netherlands where the players would prepare for the upcoming season.
On 6 July, the Defender Bongani Khumalo joined PAOK on loan from Tottenham Hotspur.
On 8 July, PAOK completed the signing of Guinean striker Sambégou Bangoura from Panseraikos on a free transfer.
On 20 July, Kostas Stafylidis agreed to sign a 5-year contract with Bayer 04 Leverkusen. The transfer was reported to be worth €1.5 million. PAOK kept the player for one year as a loan.
On 26 July, after the friendly match against PSV Eindhoven, Giorgos Donis announced that Guinean Sambégou Bangoura, was not counted for the upcoming season.
On 27 July, when Dario Krešić realised that he is not counted as the main goalkeeper of the team, asked to leave from the club. PAOK released him the next day.
On 28 July Stelios Malezas was sold to Fortuna Düsseldorf on a transfer that was reported to be worth €450 thousand. The player leaves the club after nine years and 129 appearances.
On 10 August Russian businessman Ivan Savvidi bought 51% of shares of the Club making him the major shareholder. PAOK passes to a new era, after many years of financial problems.
On 13 August, centre back Matheus Vivian and midfielder Liam Lawrence join PAOK on a two-year contract.
On 31 October, midfielder Ergys Kace signed his first professional contract, with a duration of 4,5 years. The new contract came as an award for the good appearances that he made.
On 11 December, PAOK agreed on a one and a half year contract with the Greece national football team captain, Kostas Katsouranis. On 14 December the player was officially presented by club's president.

Players

Current squad

Last updated: 31 January 2013 
Source: Squad at PAOK FC official website

Transfers

In

Out

Last updated: 31 January 2013

Current technical staff

   Georgios Kostikos

Kit

|
|
|

Pre-season and friendlies
{|
|-
|  style="vertical-align:top;"|

|  style="vertical-align:top;"|

Competitions

Overview

Super League

League table

Results summary

Results by round

Matches

Last updated: 21 April 2013Source: Super League Greece, PAOK FC official website

Play-offs

Matches

Greek Cup

Third round

Fourth round

Quarter-finals

Semi-finals 

Last updated: 19 April 2013Source: epo.gr PAOK FC official website

UEFA Europa League

Third qualifying round

Play-off round 

Last updated: 30 August 2012Source: PAOK FC at uefa.com

Statistics

Squad statistics

! colspan="13" style="background:#DCDCDC; text-align:center" | Goalkeepers
|-

! colspan="13" style="background:#DCDCDC; text-align:center" | Defenders
|-

! colspan="13" style="background:#DCDCDC; text-align:center" | Midfielders
|-

! colspan="13" style="background:#DCDCDC; text-align:center" | Forwards
|-

1Out in Winter TW
2In in Winter TW

Goalscorers

Last updated: All matches
Source: Match reports in Competitive matches  0 shown as blank

Assists

Last updated: 17 April 2013
Source: superleaguegreece.net, uefa.com, paokfc.gr
0 shown as blank

Disciplinary record

Last updated: 14 April 2013 
Source: Match reports in competitive matches, superleaguegreece.net, uefa.com, paokfc.gr 
Only competitive matches 

 = Number of bookings;  = Number of sending offs after a second yellow card;  = Number of sending offs by a direct red card.

0 shown as blank

Overall
{|class="wikitable" style="text-align: center;"
|-
!
!Total
!Home
!Away
|-
|align=left| Games played          || 39 || 19 || 20
|-
|align=left| Games won             || 24 || 16 || 8
|-
|align=left| Games drawn           || 9 || 2 || 7
|-
|align=left| Games lost            || 6 || 1 || 5
|-
|align=left| Biggest win           || 6–0 vs Kallithea || 6–0 vs Kalithea || 3–0 vs Skoda Xanthi  4–1 vs Panthrakikos
|-
|align=left| Biggest loss          || 0–3 vs Rapid Wien || 0–1 vs Skoda Xanthi || 0–3 vs Rapid Wien
|-
|align=left| Biggest win (League)  || 4–1 vs Aris || 4–1 vs Aris ||4–1 vs Panthrakikos  3–0 vs Skoda Xanthi
|-
|align=left| Biggest win (Cup)     || 6–0 vs Kalithea|| 6–0 vs Kalithea ||3–1 vs Aiginiakos
|-
|align=left| Biggest win (Europe)  || 4–1 vs Bnei Yehuda || 4–1 vs Bnei Yehuda || 2–0 vs Bnei Yehuda
|-
|align=left| Biggest loss (League) || 0–2 vs Panathinaikos || 0–1 vs Skoda Xanthi || 0–2 vs Panathinaikos
|-
|align=left| Biggest loss (Cup)    || 0–2 vs Kallithea ||  ||0–2 vs Kallithea
|-
|align=left| Biggest loss (Europe) || 0–3 vs Rapid Wien ||  ||0–3 vs Rapid Wien
|-
|align=left| Goals scored          || 65 || 42 || 23
|-
|align=left| Goals conceded        || 28 || 11 || 17
|-
|align=left| Goal difference       || +37 || +31 || +6
|-
|-
|-
|align=left| Yellow cards         || 92 || 36 || 56
|-
|align=left| Red cards            || 12 || 4 || 8
|-
|align=left| Most appearances     ||  Stefanos Athanasiadis   Ergys Kace   Dimitris Salpingidis (33)|| colspan=2|–
|-
|align=left| Most minutes played  ||  Stefanos Athanasiadis (2894) || colspan=2|–
|-
|align=left| Most goals           ||  Stefanos Athanasiadis (21) || colspan=2|–
|-
|align=left| Most assists         ||  Liam Lawrence (7) || colspan=2|–
|-
|align=left| Winning rate         || 61.54% || 84.21% || 40%
|-

References

External links
 PAOK FC official website
 PAOK FC at Super League official website

Paok
PAOK FC seasons